Sweet Pond State Park is a 100-acre state park in Guilford, Vermont surrounding 18-acre Sweet Pond, an artificial impoundment on Keats Brook that is currently full as of 2019.

This is an undeveloped, day-use park. There is a public parking area and the 1.3 miles Sweet Pond Trail that circumnavigates the pond.

References

External links
 Official web site

State parks of Vermont
Guilford, Vermont
Protected areas of Windham County, Vermont